The Book of Iod is a collection of short stories by Henry Kuttner published by Chaosium in 1995.

Plot summary
The Book of Iod is part of the Cthulhu Cycle Books series from Chaosium, and includes eleven stories by Kuttner originally published between 1936 and 1939, as well as one story by editor Robert M. Price and one by Lin Carter.

Reception
Steve Faragher reviewed The Book of iod for Arcane magazine, rating it an 8 out of 10 overall. Faragher comments that "Rather a fine collection of stories [...] Kuttner was a young man profoundly influenced by HP Lovecraft, who became a member of the Lovecraft circle in the year before the Grand Old Man of Horror died."

Review
Review by Stephen Theaker (2015) in Theaker's Quarterly Fiction, #51

References

1995 short story collections
Chaosium books
Fantasy short story collections